The 1986–87 Wessex Football League was the first season of the Wessex Football League. The champions of this inaugural season were Bashley. There was no promotion or relegation.

League table
The league consisted of one division of 17 clubs. Most of the league's members were drawn from the Hampshire League Division One, except for:
Bashley – Hampshire League Division Two
Bournemouth, Wellworthy Athletic – Hampshire League Division Three
Road-Sea Southampton – Southern League Premier Division
Thatcham Town – London Spartan League
Steyning Town – Sussex League

References

Wessex Football League seasons
9